Kutlay Erk (born 1952) is a Cypriot politician. He served as mayor of North Nicosia, the Turkish Cypriot part of Nicosia, the capital of Cyprus, from 2002 to 2006. Erk was elected to the post in June 2002 for a four-year term, leaving office in June 2006.

References

1952 births
Living people
Foreign ministers of Northern Cyprus
Turkish Cypriot socialists
People from Nicosia
Mayors of North Nicosia
Türk Maarif Koleji alumni